Persatuan Sepakbola Indonesia Kuta Raja, commonly known as Persiraja, is an Indonesian football club based in Banda Aceh, Aceh. They currently compete in the Liga 2. They play their home matches either at Harapan Bangsa Stadium or H. Dimurthala Stadium. Their most memorable achievements is when they became champion of Perserikatan in 1980.

History

Persiraja Banda Aceh was founded as a semi-professional team on 28 July 1957, initiated by PSSI. The name change from previous Persib Banda to its current name is unknown to the public. In the early formation of this team, the team's headquarters are located at Blang Padang Field, before being moved to the H. Dimurthala Stadium in Lampineung. At the beginning, since its inception, there's nothing special from this team. The club is still under the shadow of PSMS Medan who previously was one of the strongest teams in Indonesia. In the effort for finding the talented players, the team is making a "Bonden" or another term for the academy. During the period between 1957 until 1974, there was no great achievement to be proud of. Until finally in 1975, Persiraja successfully overcome the shadows of PSMS Medan. In the 1974-1975 season of PSSI National Championship western region, Persiraja successfully become champion by beating strongest teams from Sumatra. At that time, Persiraja successfully topped the final standings with 11 points and goal difference 31-10 (21). Thus, Persiraja were advance to the national round of 1975-1978 PSSI National Championship with PSMS, PSL, and PS Bangka. At the beginning of its participation, Persiraja broke through until reached the top 8. Persiraja also began to be known by everyone in the country. In the following season, Persiraja managed to increase their ranking to top 5. Persiraja could have been relegated in 1979, but PSSI did prevented it by adding a team so there were total of six teams. Finally, in 1980, Persiraja successfully become a national champion by beating Persipura Jayapura 3–1 in the final game held in Gelora Senayan Stadium (former name of Gelora Bung Karno Stadium). In the end, Persiraja have to wait for 23 years since 1957 to win the title in the national football arena.

Rivalries
Persiraja used to have a rivalry with fellow Aceh club, PSAP Sigli. This derby is usually called as the "Classic Aceh Derby". Their matches were always in hot atmosphere. One most tragic incident occurred in 2014, when PSAP Sigli goalkeeper, Agus Rahman, made a harsh tackle on Persiraja striker, Akli Fairuz. Akli suffered bladder leakage and, a few days after the match, died from his internal injuries due to that tackle. He received a year suspension given by PSSI. Nowadays, since Persiraja and PSAP Sigli are no longer in the same league level, the rivalry has been coolen down. In addition, Persiraja also have a rivalry with another Aceh club, PSBL Langsa.

Supporters
Most of spectators in Persiraja games are not affiliated with any supporter community and go to stadium just to enjoy the game. However, Persiraja have relatively small numbers of fanatic supporter community named SKULL, which was established in 2007. The name is an abbreviation of Suporter Kutaraja Untuk Lantak Laju (en: Banda Aceh Supporter for the Keep Fighting). They used to have rivalry and conflict with The LAN, which is the supporter community of other Aceh club, PSAP Sigli. However the two supporter communities ended the conflict in 2014.

Ownership 
Like most Perserikatan clubs, Persiraja had been funded by the local municipality. However, according to new ordinance by Indonesian Minister of Internal Affair in 2017, the local municipalities are no longer allowed to give any fund support to Indonesian professional clubs, which means for all clubs in Liga 1 and Liga 2, including Persiraja.
Therefore, in March 2017, the management of Persiraja established a private company. Nazaruddin, a local businessman, bought most shares, forming PT Persiraja Lantak Laju, and became the club's president.

On 22 August 2022, Nazzarudin Dek GAM has resigned from his position as president club and his position was given to Zulfikar Syahabuddin who is one of the local businessmen who is active in religious activities such as congregational dawn safaris and as a lecturer.

Players

Current squad

Club Officials

Stadiums

Persiraja Banda Aceh's main home stadium is H. Dimurthala Stadium, located in Lampineung village, Kuta Alam sub-district, Banda Aceh. The stadium is considered as the "Stadium of the most Sacred", because every other team that played in Banda Aceh, never draw against Persiraja, let alone defeat it. Before deciding to move to the old stadium in the second round of competition Indonesian Premier League, the team spent some period playing at the Harapan Bangsa Stadium, located in Lhong Raya, Banda Raya, Banda Aceh. The result was not disappointing, three wins and four draws. But, after they switched back their homeground to H. Dimurthala Stadium, the result was incredible. Of the five games that were held in H. Dimurthala Stadium, all games were won by Persiraja with perfect or 100% without loss though. Ever since, Persiraja use only H. Dimurthala Stadium for their home game's venue.

In 2017 and 2018 seasons, Persiraja statistics in this stadium were very impressive, having won 17 out of total 20 games without losing any single games, scoring total 46 goals and only conceded 6 goals. This positive result continues in 2019 season, that Persiraja had 100% home winning record in all their 11 home matches. By the end of this season, they won promotion to Liga 1.

After winning a promotion to 2020 Liga 1, Persiraja will move back their home ground to Harapan Bangsa Stadium, since the facility in H. Dimurthala Stadium is not adequate to meet PSSI standard for Liga 1 matches.

Jersey and sponsors
The colour of team home jersey for ground player is orange, which refers to the colour of club's logo. For the 2020 Liga 1, MBB is the kit supplier for Persiraja, whilst the sponsors on jersey are Dek Gam Fondation, Bank Aceh, Lion Parcel, Extra Joss, PDAM Tirta Daroy and The Atjeh Connection.

Past seasons 
The following table is Persiraja achievement in Indonesian league system since Liga Indonesia era

Key
 Div. = Name of Division Played
 Tie. = Tier level in Indonesian league pyramid at the time of competition

Notes
From 1994-95 to 2007-08, Liga Indonesia Premier Division (not to be confused with Indonesian Premier League or IPL) was the first-tier league in Indonesian league pyramid, before became the second-tier league (present day: Liga 2). In 2008, Indonesian Super League replaced it as the first-tier league in Indonesian league pyramid.
Indonesian Premier League (IPL) was a fully professional football competition as the shared top tier of the football league pyramid in Indonesia with the Indonesia Super League within 2011-2013 before the two leagues merged for the 2014 season.
The 2016 ISC B was a football competition that replaced the temporarily-suspended LI Premier Division.
 Persiraja should be relegated this season, but had dispensation due to 2004 Indian Ocean earthquake
 2007-08 was the last season of Liga Indonesia Premier Division played as first-tier league. Only 20 out of 38 clubs were then qualified to 2008-09 Indonesia Super League. The rest 18 clubs were considered relegated and then played in 2008-09 Liga Indonesia Premier Division as the second-tier league.
 Since PSSI started Piala Indonesia as the professional cup competition in 2005, the competition has not been held in annual basis.

Honours
 Perserikatan 
 Winners: 1980
 Liga Indonesia ''Premier Division / Liga 2 
Runners-Up: 2010-11
Third Place: 2019

References

External links
 
  
  

 
Football clubs in Indonesia
Football clubs in Aceh
1957 establishments in Indonesia
Association football clubs established in 1957